Jiří Zavřel (2 October 1910 – 8 September 1987) was a Czechoslovak rower. He competed at the 1936 Summer Olympics in Berlin with the men's single sculls where he was eliminated in the round one repêchage.

On 3 May 1947, he was sentenced to 12 years in prison for wartime espionage for Germany.

In 1956, he married the actress Zita Kabátová; she was the niece of the actor and writer Josef Šváb-Malostranský. They had a child the following year who they named Jiří.

References

External links

1910 births
1987 deaths
Czechoslovak male rowers
Olympic rowers of Czechoslovakia
Rowers at the 1936 Summer Olympics
European Rowing Championships medalists